Pamela Kilborn-Ryan, AM, MBE (born 12 August 1939) is an Australian former athlete who set world records as a hurdler. For three years, she was ranked as the world's top woman hurdler.

Kilborn was also an Olympic class sprinter, Long Jumper and pentathlete, and loved shot put, she also won a total of 17 individual Australian Championships between 1962 and 1972.

Career

Early career
Kilborn was born on 12 August 1939 in Melbourne. She began competing in athletics there during the late 1950s.  She competed for the University High School team, under coach Henri Schubert alongside her good friend Judy Amoore (later Pollock).

In 1960 she attempted to gain selection for the 1960 Summer Olympics but could only place third in the Australian Championships with only the first two athletes chosen.  She was reputedly so ill during these Championships that she had to be assisted on the medal dais.

During 1961 her performances at both hurdles and long jump had improved substantially and she was ranked No. 4 and No. 10 in the world, respectively, at the end of the year.

International career
At the 1962 British Empire and Commonwealth Games in Perth, Western Australia, Kilborn became one of the stars of the Games, upsetting world-record holder Betty Moore in the 80 m hurdles race before winning the long jump contest ahead of two countrywomen Helen Frith (silver) and Janet Knee (bronze).

Two years later, at the Summer Olympics in Tokyo, she won the bronze medal behind Karin Balzer (gold) and Teresa Ciepły (silver) after having equalled the Olympic record in the semi-final.

Soon after the Games, on 5 October 1964, she equalled the World Record for 80 m Hurdles, running 10.5 in Tokyo.  On 6 February 1965 in Melbourne, she bettered her record with a 10.4 time.

At the 1966 Commonwealth Games in Kingston, Jamaica she won gold medals in 80 m hurdles and 4x110 yards relay.

In 1967 she broke Christine Perera's unofficial 100 m hurdles world record of 13.7 seconds and improved it twice up to 13.3 seconds in 1969.

Having been undefeated since the 1964 Olympics, Kilborn was the favourite for the 1968 Summer Olympics in Mexico City.  At the Games she was hampered by a shoulder injury and could not overcome her surprising teenage countrywoman Maureen Caird in the rain-affected final. She won silver in the 80 metre hurdles.

In 1970 the international hurdling distance was extended to 100 metres and, competing at the British Commonwealth Games, she beat Caird to take yet another gold medal. Her three successive golds was the most ever won by any athlete at the Commonwealth Games.  Earlier in the Games she was chosen to carry the Australian standard in the Opening Ceremony; the first time a woman had been awarded this honour.

After a brief retirement, she returned to the track for one last Olympic campaign in 1972.  She set a World Record of 12.5 (12.93 automatic timing) shortly before the 1972 Olympics in Munich, but could only run fourth in the Olympic final.

Honours
Kilborn was made a Member of the Order of the British Empire (MBE) in the 1971 New Year Honours for services in sporting and international spheres, and a Member of the Order of Australia (AM) in 2008. She was inducted into the Sport Australia Hall of Fame in 1985 and received a Centenary Medal in 2001.

Statistics
National Records
Kilborn set multiple Australian records in seven different events during her career: 80 metre hurdles, 100 metres hurdles, 200 metres hurdles, Long Jump, Pentathlon, 4 x 200 metres relay, and 4 x 220 yards relay.

World Records

Over 80 metres hurdles, Kilborn set two official world records in 1964 and 1965.

In the 100 metres hurdles, she set one official world record at Warsaw on 28 June 1972.

At 200 m hurdles, Kilborn-Ryan set four official world records between 1969 and 1971, with a best of 25.7.

In team events, she set a world record for 4 x 220 yards relay of 1:35.8 in Brisbane on 9 November 1969, teaming with Raelene Boyle, Jenny Lamy and Marion Hoffman.

Personal Bests

World Rankings – Hurdles and Long Jump

Australian Championships Record – prior to 1963 Championships were held every two years

References

External links 
 

1939 births
Living people
Sportswomen from Victoria (Australia)
Athletes from Melbourne
Australian female hurdlers
Australian female sprinters
Australian female long jumpers
Olympic athletes of Australia
Olympic silver medalists for Australia
Olympic bronze medalists for Australia
Athletes (track and field) at the 1964 Summer Olympics
Athletes (track and field) at the 1968 Summer Olympics
Athletes (track and field) at the 1972 Summer Olympics
Medalists at the 1964 Summer Olympics
Medalists at the 1968 Summer Olympics
Commonwealth Games gold medallists for Australia
Commonwealth Games medallists in athletics
Athletes (track and field) at the 1962 British Empire and Commonwealth Games
Athletes (track and field) at the 1966 British Empire and Commonwealth Games
Athletes (track and field) at the 1970 British Commonwealth Games
World record setters in athletics (track and field)
Sport Australia Hall of Fame inductees
Australian Members of the Order of the British Empire
Members of the Order of Australia
Olympic silver medalists in athletics (track and field)
Olympic bronze medalists in athletics (track and field)
People educated at University High School, Melbourne
Medallists at the 1962 British Empire and Commonwealth Games
Medallists at the 1966 British Empire and Commonwealth Games
Medallists at the 1970 British Commonwealth Games